Andrzej Nowak (born 1960 in Cracow) is a Polish historian and opinion journalist.

Life and work 
He is a professor at Jagiellonian University and at the Institute of History of the Polish Academy of Sciences in Warsaw, where he is the head of the Section for the History of Eastern Europe and the Empires of the 19th and 20th Centuries. Before that (1996) he was visiting professor at Rice University. He was the co-founder and for many years (1994–2012) chief editor of the prestigious conservative cultural-political magazine Arcana. He cooperates with the monthly Wpis regularly and is one of the main authors of the publishing house Biały Kruk.

Andrzej Nowak has published over 40 books (sold in almost half a million copies) and more than 200 historical publications (articles and studies) in scientific periodicals and dozens of articles, reviews and interviews.

His main research areas are: cultural and political history of Eastern Europe in the 19th and 20th century; political philosophy; international political relations; modern mass-media. He has published several books about the Polish-Russian relations. He is currently the president of the Advisory Council of The Centre for Polish-Russian Dialogue and Understanding, as well as a member of the Council of Poland's Institute of National Remembrance. Due to his expertise in history and modern politics he is a frequent guest of radio programs and talk-shows. Nowak was invited to speak at the most prestigious universities all over the world, e.g. in Harvard, Cambridge, Columbia, Simon Fraser (Vancouver), Toronto, Tokyo, McGill, Alberta (in Edmonton).

Between 1980 and 1988 Andrzej Nowak was involved in anti-Communist journalistic and educational activities, publishing many articles in so-called underground magazines, such as Arka, Miesięcznik Małopolski, Alternatywy, Tumult. He also participated in a system of alternative lectures of history for workers organized during the martial law in Poland by the catholic priest Kazimierz Jankowski in Krakow-Nowa Huta (Christian University for Workers) and in the so called Free Jagiellonian University. He took part in two international conferences on human rights (in Kraków-Mistrzejowice 1989 and Leningrad - 1990). Between 1989 and 1991 he worked in the international section of the independent daily "Czas Krakowski". After that he concentrated on his academic career and transferred to the Institute of History of the Polish Academy of Sciences in Warsaw (since 1991) and then to the Jagiellonian University (since 2004).

Andrzej Nowak is known for his monumental History of Poland (Dzieje Polski). As of January 2020, he has finished four volumes of the planned eleven.

He has received several awards and honors, including the Order of the White Eagle (Polish: Order Orła Białego), Poland's highest state distinction.

Andrzej Nowak is married and has two kids.

Main works
, 1831–1849 (Between Tsar and Revolution. A Study of Political Imagination and Attitudes of the Polish Great Emigration, 1831–1849), Warszawa 1994, 370 pp;
 (How to break up the Russian Empire? Ideas of the Polish Eastern Policy, 1733–1921), Warszawa 1995, 270 pp.
Kronika Polski, Wydawnictwo Kluszczyński, Kraków 1997.
John Paul II. Illustrated Biography, Wydawnictwo Kluszczyński, Krakow 2005.
History and Geopolitics. A Contest for Eastern Europe, Wydawnictwo Polski Instytut Spraw Międzynarodowych, Warszawa 2008.
 (Poles, Russians, and demons. Historical studies and essays from the 19th and 20th centuries), Kraków 1998, 270 pp.
, Wydawnictwo Biały Kruk, Kraków 2010.
, CDK, Brno 2010.
, Wydawnictwo Biały Kruk, Kraków 2010.
, Wydawnictwo Biały Kruk, Kraków 2011.
, Wydawnictwo Biały Kruk, Kraków 2011.
, Wydawnictwo Biały Kruk, Kraków 2011.
Imperiological Studies. A Polish Perspective, Wydawnictwo Societas Vistulana, Kraków 2011.
, Wydawnictwo Biały Kruk, Kraków 2012.
, Wydawnictwo Biały Kruk, Kraków 2014.
, Wydawnictwo Biały Kruk, Kraków 2016.
, Wydawnictwo Biały Kruk, Kraków 2014.
, Wydawnictwo Biały Kruk, Kraków 2015.
, Wydawnictwo Literackie, Kraków 2015
, Wydawnictwo Biały Kruk, Kraków 2016.
, Wydawnictwo Biały Kruk, Kraków 2016.
, Wydawnictwo Biały Kruk, Kraków 2017.
, Wydawnictwo Literackie 2018.
, Wydawnictwo Biały Kruk, Kraków 2018.
, Wydawnictwo Biały Kruk, Kraków 2018.
 (wspólnie z Martyną Deszczyńską), Wydawnictwo Biały Kruk, Kraków 2018.
, Wydawnictwo Literackie, Kraków 2019.
, Wydawnictwo Biały Kruk, Kraków 2019.
 (The defeat of the Evil Empire. The year 1920), Wydawnictwo Biały Kruk, Kraków 2020.
 (Between disorder and slavery. A short history of political thought), Wydawnictwo Biały Kruk, Kraków 2020.
 (Glory and loss. An anthology of the latest patriotic opinion journalism), Wydawnictwo Biały Kruk, Kraków 2020.
 (The history of Poland (volume 5). The Commonwealth's empire), Wydawnictwo Biały Kruk, Kraków 2021.
 (Poland and Russia. The neighborship of freedom and despotism from the 10th to the 21st century), Wydawnictwo Biały Kruk, Kraków 2022.

Awards
 POLCUL (Polish Cultural Foundation) Award in Journalism (in underground publications during the martial law in Poland), 1989;
  (Eastern Review) Award for the best book on Eastern European History, 1995;
CLIO Awards (by Commission of the Polish Historical Books Editors) for the best book on history published in Poland, 1994, 1995 and 1998 ;
 Jerzy Lojek Foundation/Institute of Joseph Piłsudski in New York Award for the whole output, 1999;
 Silver Cross of Merit, 2003;
 Book of the Year for the first volume of Dzieje Polski, 2014;
 Józef Mackiewicz Prize for Outstanding Literature for the first volume of Dzieje Polski, 2015;
 Order of Polonia Restituta Third Class, Krzyż Komandorski, the Commander's Cross, 2016;
 Kazimierz Moczarski Historical Award (Nagroda Historyczna im. Kazimierza Moczarskiego), 2016;
 Golden Feniks (Award of the Society of Catholic Editors), 2018;
 President Lech Kaczynski Award, 2019;
 Order of the White Eagle, 2019.

References

External links
History as an apology for Totalitarianism (conference paper)
Biography at Jagiellonian University
Short biography of Andrzej Nowak

1960 births
Living people
20th-century Polish historians
Polish male non-fiction writers
Rice University faculty
Academic staff of Jagiellonian University
Members of the Polish Academy of Sciences
21st-century Polish historians